E 007 is a European B class road in Uzbekistan and Kyrgyzstan, connecting the cities Tashkent – Kokand – Andijan – Osh – Irkeshtam

Route 

 A373A Road: Tashkent (E 40, E 123)  - Ohangaron
 A373 Road: Ohangaron - Angren - Andijon - Border with Kyrgyzstan
 A373B Road: Connection to Kokand (E 006) 

 ЭМ-15 Road: Border of Uzbekistan - Osh (Connects to )
 ЭМ-05 Road: Osh - Taldyk Pass - Sary-Tash (Start of concurrency with ) - Erkeshtam (at the border to China)

External links 
 UN Economic Commission for Europe: Overall Map of E-road Network (2007)

International E-road network
Roads in Uzbekistan
Roads in Kyrgyzstan